Theophilus Blakeney (c. 1730 – 22 September 1813) was an Irish politician.

He was born the son of MP John Blakeney and his wife Grace Persse of Roxborough House, County Galway, and was a brother of Robert, John and William Blakeney.

He served as a Member of Parliament (MP) for Athenry from 1768 to 1776 and from 1783 to 1799. During the intervening period, he was MP for Carlingford. He saw service with the British army at Quebec and Staten Island in 1761 while Captain in the Royal Sussex Regiment. In 1763 and again in 1776, he was appointed High Sheriff of County Galway. From 1772 he served as Surveyor General for Connacht. He married in 1782 to Margaret Stafford of Gillstown, County Roscommon. Their son was John Henry Blakeney. Their daughter Bridget married Sir Richard St George, 2nd Baronet, and had several children.

Notes

References
 ’’The History of Galway’’, Sean Spillessy, 2000.

1730s births
1813 deaths
High Sheriffs of County Galway
Irish MPs 1769–1776
Irish MPs 1776–1783
Irish MPs 1783–1790
Irish MPs 1790–1797
Irish MPs 1798–1800
18th-century Irish politicians
19th-century Irish politicians
Members of the Parliament of Ireland (pre-1801) for County Galway constituencies
Politicians from County Galway
Royal Sussex Regiment officers
Members of the Parliament of Ireland (pre-1801) for County Louth constituencies